{{Infobox election
| election_name = 2004 United States Senate election in Kansas
| country = Kansas
| type = presidential
| ongoing = no
| previous_election = 1998 United States Senate election in Kansas
| previous_year = 1998
| next_election = 2010 United States Senate election in Kansas
| next_year = 2010
| election_date = November 2, 2004
| image1 = 
| nominee1 = Sam Brownback
| party1 = Republican Party (United States)
| popular_vote1 = 780,863
| percentage1 = 69.2%
| image2 = 
| nominee2 = Lee Jones
| party2 = Democratic Party (United States)
| popular_vote2 = 310,337
| percentage2 = 27.5%
| map_image = 2004 United States Senate election in Kansas results map by county.svg
| map_size = 250px
| map_caption = County results Brownback:     Jones: 
| title = U.S. Senator
| before_election = Sam Brownback
| before_party = Republican Party (United States)
| after_election = Sam Brownback
| after_party = Republican Party (United States)
}}

The 2004 United States Senate election in Kansas''' was held November 2, 2004. Incumbent Republican U.S. Senator Sam Brownback won re-election to a second term.

Democratic primary

Candidates 
 Robert Conroy
 Lee Jones, railroad engineer

Results 

Though Robert Conroy won the Democratic nomination, he dropped out of the race shortly after becoming the nominee, noting that he expected Jones to win and was tired of campaigning. The Kansas Democratic Party selected Lee Jones as the replacement candidate.

Republican primary

Candidates 
 Sam Brownback, incumbent U.S. Senator
 Arch Naramore, businessman

Results

General election

Candidates 
 Sam Brownback (R), incumbent U.S. Senator
 George Cook (Re)
 Lee Jones (D), railroad engineer
 Steven Rosile (L)

Campaign 
Brownback raised $2.5 million for his re-election campaign, while Jones raised only $90,000. Kansas last elected a Democratic senator in 1932. Brownback was very popular in the state.

Predictions

Results

See also 
 2004 United States Senate elections

References 

United States Senate
Kansas
2004